Wiedemannia hirtiloba is a species of dance flies, in the fly family Empididae.

References

Wiedemannia
Insects described in 1924
Diptera of Europe
Taxa named by Paul Gustav Eduard Speiser